Joël Robert (26 November 1943 – 13 January 2021) was a Belgian professional motocross racer. He competed in the Motocross World Championships from 1962 to 1976 when the sport experienced a surge in popularity worldwide. A six-time world champion, Robert dominated the 250cc class for almost a decade when, he placed either first or second every year between 1964 and 1972 including, five consecutive world championships. In 1964, he was named the recipient of the Belgian National Sports Merit Award. He won a total of 50 Grand Prix races over his career, a record which stood for nearly 30 years.
 
Robert's success on the race track along with his impish personality made him one of the most publicized and popular motocross racers of the early 1970s. He was known as one of the most naturally talented motocross riders of his era however, he was also notorious for his cigarette smoking and lack of physical training despite his portly physique. His rivalry with Torsten Hallman produced some of the best races in the history of the championships.

Robert played an integral role in the introduction of the sport of motocross in the United States and, served as inspiration to early American motocross racers. He was recognized for his contribution to the development of American motocross in 2000 when, he was inducted into the AMA Motorcycle Hall of Fame. In 2020, Robert was named an FIM Motocross Legend.

Motorcycle racing career
Robert was born in Châtelet, Belgium and began riding motorcycles at the age of 6 when his father, a former motocross and speedway racer, built him his first motorcycle, a 125cc Gillet. His boyhood idols were Belgian motocross stars René Baeten and Auguste Mingels.

At the age of 16, Robert converted a Zündapp street bike into a motocross bike and, entered his first motocross race on April 10, 1960. His parents provided him with financial support and accompanied him to many of the races close to Belgium. Other times he would travel with fellow racers or, sometimes by train with his dismantled motorcycle packed into his hand luggage. He won the Belgium junior motocross championship in his first year of competition.

After earning his expert class license in 1961, he switched to riding a Greeves and, won six races to finish second in the 250cc Belgian motocross national championship. He rode the 250cc Greeves to five victories the following year to win the 1962 Belgian motocross national championship. The FIM inaugurated the 250cc motocross world championship in 1962 and Robert was able to compete in some Grand Prix races, finishing the season ranked 14th in the world. In 1963, he repeated as Belgian national champion riding the Greeves and, entered all the world championship Grand Prix rounds where, he ended the season ranked 25th in the world with a fifth place at the 250cc Swedish Grand Prix being his best result.

At the end of the 1963 season, Robert's future racing career was in doubt as, his father lacked the financial resources to purchase a new motorcycle for the following season. Fortunately for Robert, Torsten Hallman rejected a contract to race for the CZ factory racing team, preferring to stay with the Husqvarna racing team. After being rejected by Hallman, CZ then offered Robert a motorcycle through the Belgian CZ importer to compete in the 1964 250cc motocross world championship as a privateer. He won 9 of the 14 Grand Prix races that year to clinch the world championship ahead of second place Torsten Hallman.

At the age of 20, he became the youngest motocross world champion at the time. He also won the Belgium national championship and was the top individual points scorer at the 1964 Motocross des Nations, winning both 500cc motos at the challenging Citadel of Namur race track. His impressive performance earned him a place on the CZ factory racing team for the 1965 season however, he experienced mechanical failures and ended the season ranked second to Victor Arbekov in the 250cc motocross world championship.

The following three seasons were marked by the rivalry between Robert and Hallman. Robert finished second to Hallman in the 1966 and 1967 250cc world championships before, he defeated Hallman in 1968 by a two point margin to win his second world championship. He won six Grand Prix races during the 1969 season to successfully defend his world championship over second place Sylvain Geboers. Robert was also a member of the Belgian team that won the 1969 Motocross des Nations for 500cc motorcycles and the Trophée des Nations for 250cc motorcycles, marking the first Belgian victory in eighteen years at the event.

For the 1970 season, Robert was wooed from CZ by the Japanese manufacturer Suzuki, who was seeking to make inroads into the European dominated sport. He continued his winning streak with Suzuki by capturing the 1970 250cc world championship by a two point margin over his Suzuki teammate Sylvain Geboers. He also helped the Belgian team repeat as winners of the 1970 Motocross des Nations and the Trophée des Nations. Robert played an integral role in the introduction of the sport of motocross in the United States by participating in the Trans-AMA motocross series which featured top European racers competing against the best American racers. He dominated the 1970 Trans-AMA series by winning six consecutive races. His participation in the year-end Trans-AMA series gave credibility to America's first motocross championship.

Robert continued to rule the 250cc world championship in 1971 by winning  eight out of twelve Grand Prix races that year. In the 1972 250cc world championship season, he won six of the first eight Grand Prix races to build an insurmountable lead en route to winning his fifth consecutive world championship. He also participated in the Belgian teams triumph at the 1972 Motocross des Nations and Trophée des Nations.

Robert suffered a knee injury during the 1972 season but, he refused to undergo surgery. The knee injury affected his performance during the 1973 season and, he dropped to 18th in the world championship. He continued to struggle with his injury for the next two seasons before Suzuki released him from his contract after the 1975 season. He signed a contract with Puch but, only raced in a few Grand Prix races and ended the season ranked 19th in the 1976 250cc world championship. His last professional race was an international race in France on a Puch 400MC.

Robert won more than 250 World and international victories—including six 250cc motocross world championships and 50 Grand Prix wins during his career and, was a member of three victorious Belgian Motocross des Nations teams. His record of 50 motocross Grand Prix victories stood for nearly 30 years until it was broken in 2004 by fellow Belgian, Stefan Everts. American Grand Prix motocross racer Jim Pomeroy commented on Robert's impressive physical strength in an interview, recalling how he watched him lift the rear end of a small car.

Later life
Robert was inducted into the AMA Motorcycle Hall of Fame along with Torsten Hallman in 2000. He also served as manager for Belgium's Motocross des Nations team leading them to victory in 1997 and 1998.

Robert developed diabetes which resulted in having his foot amputated in 2018. He also suffered from lung problems and had experienced a few strokes. Robert contracted COVID-19 in early 2021 during the COVID-19 pandemic in Belgium and was hospitalized but there he suffered a heart attack that left him in a coma. He died on 13 January 2021.

Motocross grand prix results

References

External links

 Joel Robert Interview

1943 births
2021 deaths
People from Châtelet
Belgian motocross riders
Sportspeople from Hainaut (province)
Deaths from the COVID-19 pandemic in Belgium